This is a list of members of the Western Australian Legislative Council from 16 July 1894 to 27 July 1896. The chamber had 21 seats made up of seven provinces each electing three members, on a system of rotation whereby one-third of the members would retire at each biennial election. As this was the first election of the Legislative Council under responsible government in Western Australia, following the passage of the Constitution Act Amendment Act 1893, all seats were vacant at the time of the election, and therefore the candidate with most votes in each province was elected for six years, the second-most for four years and the third-most for two years.

Notes
  On 19 December 1894, Edward Wittenoom (Central Province) was appointed Minister for Mines in the Forrest Ministry. He was therefore required to resign and submit to a ministerial by-election, and was returned unopposed on 17 January 1895.
  On 11 July 1895, the seat held by Harry Marshall (West Province) was declared vacant due to bankruptcy. Alfred Kidson was elected unopposed to fill the remainder of the term.
  On 25 June 1895, Ernest Henty (Central Province) died, and a by-election was held on 25 July 1895, at which William Alexander was elected to fill the remainder of the term.
  On 9 June 1896, Edward Davies (West Province) resigned, and a by-election was held on 30 June 1896, at which Henry Briggs was elected to fill the remainder of the term.

Sources
 
 

Members of Western Australian parliaments by term